Ian Buchanan is an Australian public academic. He has published works on Michel de Certeau, Gilles Deleuze and Fredric Jameson.

Biography
Born in rural Western Australia, Buchanan grew up in the suburbs of Perth. He did his BA and PhD in the English and Comparative Literature program at Murdoch University, graduating in 1995. His PhD dissertation is titled 'Heterology: Towards a Transcendental Empiricist Approach to Cultural Studies.'

Work 
Buchanan edited special issues of the journals Social Semiotics (vol 7:2, 1997) and South Atlantic Quarterly (vol 93:3, 1997), the latter was subsequently reprinted as the book A Deleuzian Century?

Bibliography
Books
Michel de Certau: Cultural Theorist (London: 2000, SAGE Publications) ISBN  0761958983
Deleuze: A Metacommentary (Edinburgh: Edinburgh University Press, 2000) ISBN 0748610057
Fredric Jameson: Live Theory (London & New York: Continuum, 2006) ISBN  082649109X
Deleuze and Guattari's Anti-Oedipus (London & New York: Continuum, 2008) ISBN  0826491499
Assemblage Theory and Method: An Introduction and Guide (London & New York: Bloomsbury Academic, 2020) ISBN  1350015555
The Incomplete Project of Schizoanalysis: Collected Essays on Deleuze and Guattari (Edinburgh: Edinburgh University Press, 2021) ISBN  1474487890

References

1969 births
Living people
People from Western Australia
Academic staff of the University of Wollongong
20th-century Australian philosophers
21st-century Australian philosophers
20th-century Australian writers
21st-century Australian writers
Critical theorists
Murdoch University alumni